Clementia Taylor (née Doughty; 17 December 1810 – 11 April 1908) was an English women's rights activist and radical.

Life
Clementia (known as Mentia to her friends) was born in Brockdish, Norfolk, one of twelve children. Her family was Unitarian, and Clementia became the governess to the daughters of a Unitarian minister who ran a boys' boarding school at Hove. In 1842 Clementia married Peter Alfred Taylor, the cousin of her pupils. Taylor was later the Liberal Member of Parliament for Leicester.

In 1863, Peter Taylor bought Aubrey House in the Campden Hill district of Holland Park in West London. The Taylors opened the Aubrey Institute in the grounds of the house; the institute gave young people the chance to improve a poor education they might have had. The lending library and reading room of the institute had over 500 books.

Taylor, Mary Estlin and Eliza Wigham were active in anti-slavery movement in England and in 1863 they all served on Ladies' London Emancipation Society which Taylor led. The Taylors were also closely involved in the movement for Italian unification and Giuseppe Mazzini was a frequent visitor to Aubrey House. During his celebrated 1864 visit to London, a reception was held at Aubrey House for Giuseppe Garibaldi and after Garibaldi visited Mazzini. Noted radical figures at the reception included feminist Emilie Ashurst Venturi; Aurelio Saffi, Karl Blind, Ferdinand Freiligrath, Alexandre Auguste Ledru-Rollin and Louis Blanc.

In Moncure D. Conway's autobiography he describes the Taylor's salon at Aubrey House, and Clementia's "Pen and Pencil Club" at which the work of young writers and artists was read and exhibited. Conway, an American abolitionist and clergyman, moved to Notting Hill to be near the Taylors at Aubrey House. The Taylor's social gatherings were also noted by the American author Louisa May Alcott.

Attendees of the "Pen and Pencil Club" included the diarist Arthur Munby, and many poets and authors who later achieved fame. Aubrey House was also visited by feminists Barbara Bodichon, Lydia Becker, Elizabeth Blackwell, and Elizabeth Malleson. Clementia Taylor was on the organizing committee of the 1866 petition in favour of women's suffrage that John Stuart Mill presented to the British parliament; the 1499 signatures were collated in Aubrey House. It was in the house that the Committee of the London National Society for Women's Suffrage, held its first meeting in July 1867.

In 1873, the Taylors sold Aubrey House due to Peter's ill health, established an apartment near parliament house for when the Commons sat, and moved to Brighton. Mentia Taylor died in Brighton in 1908.

References
Notes

Bibliography
; cited as ODNB.

1810 births
1908 deaths
People from South Norfolk (district)
English suffragists
English Unitarians
People from the Royal Borough of Kensington and Chelsea
People from Brighton